Chasse-marée may refer to:

 Chasse-marée (boat), a specific, archaic type of decked commercial sailing vessel
 Chasse-marée (cart), a cart drawn by 4 horses for the transport of fresh fish